Kostanyan is an Armenian surname. Notable people with the surname include:

 Anna Kostanyan (born 1987), Armenian politician
 Gayane Kostanyan (born 1988), Armenian football player
 Murad Kostanyan (1902–1989), Armenian actor

Armenian-language surnames